Van de Wetering is a Dutch toponymic surname, meaning "from/of the (drainage) channel". Among spelling variants are Watering, Weetering and Weteringh. Many waters in the Netherlands have the name as well a number of towns, themselves named after a wetering, e.g. Wetering, Nieuwe-Wetering, Nieuwe-Wetering, and Oude Wetering. Forms without the article (Van Wetering etc.) likely refer to such a settlement. People with these names name include:

Van de Wetering
 Ernst van de Wetering (1938–2021), Dutch Rembrandt expert
 Henricus van de Wetering (1850–1929), Dutch archbishop
 Janwillem van de Wetering (1931–2008), Dutch–American author of detective novels 
 Peter Van de Wetering (1931–2014), Dutch–American horticulturist
Van Wetering
Bo van Wetering (born 1999), Dutch handball player
Ineke van Wetering (1934–2011), Dutch anthropologist and Surinamist

Van de Weetering
 (1929–2017), Dutch ballet dancer and choreographer
Myrthe van de Weetering (born 1988), Dutch violinist and composer

References

Dutch-language surnames
Surnames of Dutch origin